Víctor López Morón (born 23 May 1968) is a retired professional male tennis player from Spain. 

He made his only ATP singles main draw appearance as a wild card at the 1988 Torneo Godó, where he was defeated in the first round by fellow Barcelona native Germán López.

After retiring from tennis, he coached his brother Álex.

Notes

References

External links
 
 

1968 births
Living people
Tennis players from Catalonia
Spanish male tennis players
Tennis players from Barcelona